Pablo Montero (born Óscar Daniel Hernández Rodríguez August 23, 1974) is a Mexican singer and actor. Montero's primary profession is singing, but he also acts regularly in telenovelas produced by Televisa productions in supporting roles. Montero is widely recognized and considered one of the most popular supporting actors in telenovelas.

Personal life 
From about 2000 to 2003, Montero had a relationship with Aracely Arámbula. In 2006, there were rumors about a possible romance with his costar in Duelo de Pasiones, Ludwika Paleta, who was married to Mexican actor Plutarco Haza. Montero and Paleta denied the rumors until a video was made public in which they were seen making out. This is said to have caused Ludwika Paleta's separation from her husband. Paleta and Plutarco Haza later reconciled. On August 31, 2007 two days after Montero presented the nominees for the 2007 Latin Grammy Awards, Miami Police reported that they stopped Montero and a passenger after his white BMW SUV ran a red light. During the investigation, police reported discovering a clear bag that tested positive for cocaine, which Montero claimed as his.

However, in court the following month, Montero pleaded not guilty to cocaine possession, was found guilty, and was sentenced to probation, pending completion of a court mandated drug program. Montero was jailed in 2008 for violating the terms of his probation but was released on the condition that he complete a drug rehabilitation program. On February 20, 2009, Montero graduated from his drug treatment program.

He has a son, Daniel Hernandez Piedra, born 22 February 2006 and son Pablo Hernandez Vidal, born in 28.9.2007, with the actress Sandra Vidal and two daughters, Carolina Hernandez Van Wielink born 27.2 2012 and Daniela Hernandez Van Wielink born 24 May 2014 with ex-wife Carolina Van Wielink. In June 2010, his brother Oliver was murdered in an attempted robbery. On June 13, 2013, his brother Javier Hernández was also killed.

Career 

Known for his use of "charro" hats and black clothing during his concerts, he is a teen idol and paparazzi favorite in Mexico. He is also well known in the rest of Latin America, Australia, Europe, and the Hispanic community of the United States.

When Montero was a teenager, he had his first professional singing job as the lead singer of a group named "Trébol", which had a number one hit titled "Si tu Supieras" ("If You Knew").

Montero opted for a career as a solo artist shortly after this, struggling in local bars and clubs until he got his big break in 1999 when his album Donde Estas, Corazon? (Where Are You, My Love?) became the number one album on Mexico's charts. The album's success launched his image as a "ranchera hunk" and led to his acting debut in Vivo Por Elena (I Live for Elena), where he played a struggling young singer. This was followed by acting roles in Nunca te olvidaré (I Will Never Forget You), Abrázame muy fuerte (Hold me Tight), Rebeca, and Entre el Amor y el Odio.

His 2000 album, the self-titled Pablo Montero produced the number one hit "Que Voy a Hacer sin Ti?" ("What am I Going to do Without You?"). In 2001, Montero joined other artists invited to the White House South Lawn for a Cinco de Mayo fiesta, where he serenaded First Lady Laura Bush. Pablo Montero was followed by 2002's "Pidemelo Todo" ("Ask Me for Everything"), which also included a number one hit single in "Hay Otra en tu Lugar" ("There's Another One in Your Place"). Also in this latter album was the great hit to the soap opera Gata Salvaje, which was titled the same as the soap opera and reached the top ten list on the charts. Later this year he was honored in Australia for his acting as Martin in Rebeca. He has composed the songs for various shows including Olvidarte jamás, Gata Salvaje, La Revancha, Abrázame muy fuerte, Duelo de Pasiones and the controversial movie El Crimen del Padre Amaro.

Montero spent most of 2003 touring and preparing an album that was dedicated to legendary Mexican singer Javier Solís. This album hit the markets later in the year and was well received on a national level. He was involved in a scandal during 2003 because he had apparently not paid his employees during instances that he had not required them, such as when he was on tour, and then fired them when they demanded payment. He lost the case and was forced to pay them a settlement. In 2005, Montero signed a recording contract with Univision Records.  In that year, he released his first album for Univision Records, "A Toda Ley."

In 2005, he was featured in an ad campaign by clothing company Hanes with the slogan "Mira quien tiene Hanes" ("Look who has Hanes on now.")  He and Aracely Arámbula were both featured in the Spanish-language version of the campaign. In 2006, Montero starred in the Mexican soap opera Duelo de Pasiones, which aired on Univision during 2007. In 2008, Pablo acted in Fuego en le sangre, as Franco Reyes, one of the protagonists of the telenovela, with Eduardo Yáñez and Jorge Salinas. In 2010 he worked in Triunfo del Amor with Victoria Ruffo, Maite Perroni, William Levy, Osvaldo Rios and Daniela Romo.

In mid-2012, a return to the character of "Coloso" in Salvador Mejía it convened to join Qué bonito amor a new version of La hija del mariachi, being his second antagonistic role / main villain next to Jorge, Danna García, Malliany Marin and Juan Ferrara. In 2014, he acted in Mi corazón es tuyo as Diego. Pablo reunited once again with Jorge.

In 2014, he will be a special guest acting in Lo imperdonable as Demetrio Silveria, Martin's half brother, costarrs with Ana Brenda Contreras and Iván Sánchez.

Albums
1999: Donde Estás Corazón
2000: Que Voy A Hacer Sin Ti
2002: Pídemelo Todo
2003: Gracias...Homenaje A Javier Solís
2004: Con La Bendición De Dios
2005: A Toda Ley
2006: Que Bonita Es Mi Tierra
2007: Mi Tesoro Norteño
2008: Piquito De Oro: Mi Tesoro Norteño
2011: El Abandonado

Filmography

Awards and nominations

TVyNovelas Awards

Compilations
Entrega Total...Los Éxitos (2005)

References 

1974 births
Living people
Mexican male telenovela actors
People from Torreón
Ranchera singers
Musicians from Coahuila
21st-century Mexican male singers